Graham David Taylor (born 26 December 1933), known better as Ugly Dave Gray, is an English Australian actor, television personality, comedian, game show host, and radio host.

Early life
Born Graham David Taylor, he transposed his first and middle names to come up with "Dave Gray". The "Ugly" part came from his first wife, Gail Gray, who joked that Gray was so ugly, he made her look attractive. He became active as a comedian in his native England in the 1960s, before arriving in Australia.

Career
His first television gig in Australia was in 1972, when he hosted a version of the game show Beat the Clock. Although still working as a stand-up comedian, by 1976, Gray had taken a straight dramatic role as publican Bunny Howard in the early episodes of soap opera The Young Doctors. The following year, however, Gray appeared in his most popular role, as a regular panelist on the game show Blankety Blanks. He proceeded to leave his role in The Young Doctors after his initial 13-week contract expired to work on Blankety Blanks, with Graham Kennedy himself convincing Gray to do the game show. Gray had been receiving $100 a day for The Young Doctors; with Blankety Blanks paying $45 an episode, this represented a pay cut. Later, Gray signed with agent Harry M Miller, who negotiated the increased pay rate of $75 per episode, which remained until the series ended. 

Gray was appointed Court Jester to 1977 King of Moomba Mickey Mouse (a controversial choice with some Melburnians, who preferred 'home-grown' Blinky Bill).

With his ever-present cigar, Gray became one of the most popular comedians on Australian TV. He became a game-show host in his own right, helming Celebrity Tattle Tales from 1979–80, and Play Your Cards Right from 1984-85. Gray also appeared in a series of commercials for Half Case supermarkets in the 1980s, as well as spots for other products, including an erectile dysfunction nasal spray in 2003.

Radio
In the 1980s, Gray also presented a drive-time radio program on 3UZ, with Mary Hardy.

Biography
According to Gray's autobiography, It's Funny Being Ugly, Gray was not invited to speak at Graham Kennedy's funeral in 2005, and indeed did not know where the service was being held. He had to call presenter Philip Brady for details.

Personal life
Ugly Dave Gray has two children, a daughter and a son. His son, also called Dave Gray, is following in his father's footsteps as a comedian.

In 2011, Gray announced that he wished to be cryogenically frozen after death.

Albums

Filmography

References in popular culture
Gray was portrayed by Angus Sampson in the 2007 television movie The King, about the life of Graham Kennedy.

References

External links
 

1933 births
Australian male comedians
Australian male television actors
Australian game show hosts
Australian people of English descent
Living people
Male actors from Manchester